The 2.3 metre telescope at Siding Spring Observatory is operated by the Australian National University. The Advanced Technology Telescope was constructed during the early 1980s and featured, at the time, radical features: an unusually thin mirror, an alt-az mount and co-rotating dome.  The optical telescope has Altazimuth mount and a primary mirror with a focal length of f/2.05.  It is housed in a box-shaped building which rotates as the telescope tracks objects.

Instrumentation includes an integral field spectrograph known as WiFeS, an echelle spectrograph, and a Nasmyth imager. The telescope is a workhorse for numerous large programs where it is used to do follow-up observations on objects of interest before more extensive observations are made at larger telescopes. It is also a valuable tool for training students in the astronomical observing techniques.

History
The telescope was the initiative of Don Mathewson. It was inaugurated Prime Minister, Bob Hawke on 16 May 1984. It was regarded as an achievement in high technology for Australia. In 1985, it won an award from the Institution of Engineers.

Mirror
The mirror used in the telescope is much thinner than those typically used in a telescope mirror.  Its ratio of diameter to thickness is about 20:1.  The light mirror and rotating design allows the telescope to be rapidly moved as observations are made.

See also
List of large optical telescopes
List of largest optical telescopes in the 20th century

References

Optical telescopes
Siding Spring Observatory
1984 establishments in Australia